Jimmy Cabot (born 18 April 1994) is a French professional footballer who plays as a winger for Ligue 1 club Lens.

Career
Born in Chambéry, France, Cabot made his Ligue 2 debut for Troyes AC during the 2012–13 season. On 16 August 2013, he scored his first professional goal against Nîmes Olympique in a 3–2 away defeat. On 21 February 2014, he scored his second league goal against AS Nancy in a 2–0 home win in Stade de l'Aube.

Cabot left Lorient after the club's promotion to Ligue 1 in the 2019–20 season. On 25 September 2020, he signed a three-year contract with Angers, and chose the number 11 shirt at the club.

On 22 June 2022, Cabot signed a four-year contract with Lens. On 15 October 2022, he suffered a knee injury against Montpellier that will make him miss the rest of the season.

References

External links
 Eurosport profile

1994 births
Living people
Sportspeople from Chambéry
French footballers
Footballers from Auvergne-Rhône-Alpes
Association football wingers
Ligue 1 players
Ligue 2 players
ES Troyes AC players
FC Lorient players
Angers SCO players
RC Lens players